Whole New Mess is the fifth studio album by American singer-songwriter Angel Olsen, released on August 28, 2020 on Jagjaguwar. Recorded by Olsen and engineer Michael Harris in a converted church, the album features tracks from her 2019 album, All Mirrors, arranged in a more intimate style.

Recording
Whole New Mess was recorded over ten days in October 2018 with engineers Michael Harris and Nicholas Wilbur. The pair worked in isolation in Anacortes, Washington, notable as the hometown of independent musician Phil Elverum, recording in a converted Catholic church. Olsen would use the church's corridors to create a natural echo effect on her vocals.

The album was recorded prior to Olsen's 2019 studio album, All Mirrors, which features many of the same compositions in a different form: "When we made [Whole New Mess], I was still processing a lot of the songs, so for me, it’s harder to listen to this record than it is for me to listen to All Mirrors. When I recorded All Mirrors, other people had their hands in the pot, which separated me from the songs. I could get into them in a distant way. On Whole New Mess I’m feeling every feeling that they evoke."

Composition
The album was written following the collapse of a romantic relationship, with Olsen noting: "I was really depressed. I had no idea whether the songs were good. They were just about my life. I could have recorded them at home and kept them as demos, but I knew Michael [Harris] was someone I could be depressed in front of, who would help me to explore it in different ways. It was such an emotional process."

Critical reception
The album was critically acclaimed upon its release. At Metacritic, based on fifteen professional reviews, it received a weighted average score of 83 out of 100.

Track listing

Personnel
 Angel Olsen – production
 Michael Harris – production, engineering
 Joe Lambert – mastering
 John Congleton – mixing
 Miles Johnson – art direction
 Kylie Coutts – photography

Charts

References

2020 albums
Angel Olsen albums
Jagjaguwar albums